Noarootsi Parish was a rural municipality in Lääne County, western Estonia between 1991 and 2017.

The administrative centre of Noarootsi Parish was Pürksi village. It is located 10 km north from the capital of Lääne County, Haapsalu.

Villages
There were 23 villages in Noarootsi Parish: Aulepa (Dirslätt), Dirhami (Derhamn), Einbi (Enby), Elbiku (Ölbäck), Hara (Harga), Hosby, Höbringi (Höbring), Kudani (Gutanäs), Osmussaare (Odensholm), Paslepa (Pasklep), Pürksi (Birkas), Riguldi (Rickul), Rooslepa (Roslep), Saare (Lyckholm), Spithami (Spithamn), Sutlepa (Sutlep), Suur-Nõmmküla (Klottorp), Tahu (Skåtanäs), Telise (Tällnäs), Tuksi (Bergsby),  Vanaküla (Gambyn), Väike-Nõmmküla (Persåker), Österby.

History 
Noarootsi was historically the only parish on the Estonian mainland where most of the local residents were Estonian Swedes. In 1934, the parish had 4,388 inhabitants, 2,697 (64%) of them Estonian Swedes.

Until the end of the ancient historic period, today's Noarootsi area was practically unpopulated. Noarootsi peninsula was once a group of small islands, which joined the mainland in the middle of the 19th century. The first written proof of the Swedish population stems from the 13th century. There has been speculation, although unfounded, that many of the Swedes came from Finland. For historical reasons, the Swedes had privileges (Svensk Rätt—"Swedish rights"), which consisted mainly of personal freedom and freedom of movement, and lower taxes. The Swedish population was strengthened by influx of Swedes from Uusimaa in Finland, peaking in the beginning of the 16th century.

In the second half of the 16th century, during the Livonian war, the areas of Noarootsi were plundered by Russian army troops, and many sites, such as the church, were devastated. Beginning in the 1580s, Noarootsi was subjected to Swedish rule, which lasted until 1710. The Swedish era caused the cultural life to accelerate. In Noarootsi, the first known folk high school (first mentioned in 1650) was established by local Lutheran pastor Isaacus Mariaestadius Hasselblatt. Noarootsi church added chapels in Sutlepa, Rooslepa and Osmussaar. At the same time, a line of manor houses was built, which initiated limits on the coastal Swedes' rights. Noarootsi's peasants' long fight for their freedom had begun.

During the Great Northern War, Noarootsi was attacked by the plague epidemic during 1710–1711. The number of residents decreased by two-thirds, and many villages died out completely. Estonians from the mainland came to live in the empty villages. It was the start of Noarootsi becoming Estonianized. After the Great Northern War, the conflicts between the lords of the manors and the peasants became more critical. This conflict culminated in the 1770s, with the sending of some of Hara's village residents to the mainland.

In 1816 serfdom was abolished in Estonia. It did not touch the coastal Swedish Estonians, as their condition was ambiguous. They were not slaves and yet they were not entirely free. The folks' communal self-government and permanent compulsory school attendance were established in Noarootsi in 1856.

In the middle of the 19th century, a new intellectual period began. Schools needed Swedish-speaking teachers. For their preparation in the Paslepa manor house, a teachers' training college was established, which was in operation for 14 years. The training college was led by the Swedish missionary Thure Emanuel Thorén. By the 1890s, a network of Swedish schools was formed in Estonia.

In the beginning of the 20th century, Noarootsi started to be the centre of the Swedes' intellectual activity. The local society's activities were led by Johan Nymann and Hans Pöhl. In 1898 the first choral society was established in Paslepa, and in 1902 the first Swedish lending library was established. In 1903 the first Swedish calendar was distributed. In 1909 the Swedish education association was established in the Vööla manor house. In 1920 Pürksi's folk high school was opened and it was in operation until 1943.

During the Estonian Republic, the relationship between local residents and Swedes and Finns increased remarkably. Riguldi became a very active ship construction centre, the ship Hoppet is one ship that still exists from this era. At first, potatoes and apples were exported to Sweden and Finland. It seemed that the Swedes were developing their place in Estonian society.

In 1939 the Red Army bases were brought to Estonia. During this time, a great deal of the population was evacuated from Osmussaar island. In the summer of 1940, the Soviet Union established their power and with this a border zone. It became impossible for the residents to go on with their previous occupations and they started to think about emigration to Sweden.

From 1943 to 1944 most of the Swedes left Estonia. In their place came war refugees from northeastern Estonia and Ingria. In 1944 the Soviet Army returned and the border zone was restored. The remaining inhabitants' contacts with their relatives in Sweden were cut off. During the forced emigration and building up of kolkhozes (collective farms), many villages were ruined and the coastal areas became military zones. Only a few villages have retained their original look.

The new age in Noarootsi's history started at the end of the 1980s. The border zone disappeared and the local residents could return to their homes. In 1988 the first folk day celebrations were organized in Noarootsi. In 1989 Swedish instruction was reinstated in Noarootsi. In 1990, Noarootsi Gymnasium, with immersion study in Swedish, was founded in Pürksi. Approximately 900 people lived in Noarootsi Parish in 2005, only 50 of them considered themselves Swedish.

Some Swedes have returned to Noarootsi after the demise of Soviet Union and bought or reclaimed old property, usually land, which they developed. The area is attractive for people looking for a summer house as large areas of Noarootsi have been off limits for civilians during Soviet rule. High property tax in Sweden and low in Estonia is another reason.

Chronology 
13th century (second half) Noarootsi was founded
1250 Osmussaar was first mentioned in written sources
1294 Swedish people were first mentioned near Haapsalu
1391 Noarootsi was first mentioned in sources as Nuckö
1575 Russian looting raid during the Livonian war
1581 Noarootsi came under the control of Sweden
17th century first manor estates in Noarootsi
1650 School of Noarootsi is first mentioned. A pastor of that time, Isaac Mariestadius Hasselblad, founded Pürksi Public Primary School, where reading and writing were taught in Swedish.
1710 Noarootsi along with rest of Estonia came under the control of Russia
1710-1711 Epidemic plague
1856 Local self-government was established
1873 Missionary Thure Emanuel Thorén arrived
1873-1887 Paslepa Teachers' College, which educated teachers for Swedish schools, in operation in Noarootsi
1902 The first Swedish language book was published in Noarootsi
1903 The first Swedish language calendar was distributed
1909 The Swedish Educational Society was established
1920-1943 Pürksi Folk High School, which became the Pürksi Estonian-Swedes' cultural centre, in operation in Pürksi
1935 Monument to the War of Independence in Hosby was unveiled
1940 Soviet rule established
1941 Deportations
1943-1944 The majority of Noarootsi's inhabitants left for Sweden
1988 First celebrations of the Noarootsi homestead days
1989 Second era of teaching Swedish began
1990 Noarootsi Gymnasium was opened. War of Independence monument was rededicated
1991 After the reindependence of Estonia, Noarootsi Parish was established asa municipality
1993 Paslepa Folk High School was opened
2017 During the administrative reform Noarootsi Parish was merged to Lääne-Nigula Parish

Gallery

References

External links 

  
Beyer, Jürgen, 'Whom should one thank for a narrow escape? Lessons drawn from a perilous journey from Vormsi and Noarootsi to Finland in 1796', Pro Ethnologia 17 (2004), 175-95

Former municipalities of Estonia
Former islands of Estonia